Mamidipudi Venkatarangayya (8 January 1889 – 13 January 1982) was a financial and political scientist and historical writer from Andhra Pradesh, India. He was recipient of the Padma Bhushan in 1968 by the Indian Government.

Early life
He was born in Purini village of Kovur taluq in Nellore district, British India, in 1889 to Venkatesayya and Narasamma. He joined the Pachaiyappa's College and completed B.A. in 1907 from Madras University. While working as a Tutor in the Pachiappa's college, he took his M.A. degree in History, Economics and Politics in 1910 from the same university. He actively participated in the Indian Independence Movement during the study period.

Teaching
He was appointed as Diwan of Vizianagaram Samsthanam in 1927. He joined as principal of Venkatagiri Raja College in Nellore from 1928 to 1931. Later he joined Andhra University as reader in 1931 and became professor in 1938 and retired as principal of University college in 1944.

He was invited by Bombay University to head the Political and Social Sciences department between 1949 and 1952.

He died at his residence at Secunderabad in 1982 at the age of 93 years.

Literary works
He wrote many books on Indian history, constitution, encyclopedia, panchayati raj and politics.
Chief Editor of Sangraha Andhra Vignana Kosham published by Andhra Vignana Kosha Samithi, Hyderabad (1958–1969)
Panchayati raj in Andhra Pradesh, published by State Chamber of Panchayati Raj in 1967
Mārutunna samājaṃ, nā jñāpakālu, Telugu Vidyārthi Pracuraṇalu, 1981
Āndhralō svātantryasamaramu, Saṃskr̥tika Vyavahāraśākha, Āndhrapradēś Prabhutvamu, 1972
Evariki mī ōṭu?, Yaṃ. Śēṣācalaṃ aṇḍ Kampenī, 1951
The freedom struggle in Andhra Pradesh (Andhra), Andhra Pradesh State Committee Appointed for the Compilation of a History of the Freedom Struggle in Andhra Pradesh (Andhra), 1965
Free and fair elections, Publications Division, Ministry of Information and Broadcasting, Government of India, 1966
The fundamental rights of man in theory and practice, Hind kitabs, 1944
The general election in the city of Bombay, 1952, Vora, 1953
Indian federalism, Arnold-Heinemann Publishers (India), 1975
Local government in India, Allied Publishers, 1969
Mana paripālakulu, 1962
Mana śāsana sabhalu, 1963
Mānavahakkyulu, lēka, Prāthamika svatva siddhantamu, Jātīya Jñāna Mandiramu, 1946
Pāriśrāmika viplavaṃ, 1964
Some aspects of democratic politics in India, University of Mysore, 1967
Some theories of federalism, University of Poona, 1971
Vidyāraṅgaṃ, nāḍu-nēḍu, Telugu Vidyārthi Pracuraṇalu, 1982
Vidyārthulaku okamāṭa, 1965
The welfare state and the socialist state, Triveni Publishers, 1962
Mārutunna samājaṃ, nā jñāpakālu, Telugu Vidyārthi Pracuraṇalu, 1981
Āndhralō svātantryasamaramu, 1972

Family
He married Venkamma and they had ten children: Annapurna, Godavari, Mamidipudi Narasimham, Mamidipudi Seetharam, Mamidipudi Anandam, Mamidipudi Venkateswarlu, Pattabhiram, Mamidipudi Krishnamurti, and Mamidipudi Simhachalam and Vaidehi.

Mamidipudi Anandam is a Chartered Accountant and twice Rajya Sabha member. Shanta Sinha is daughter of Anandam. She was awarded Padma Shri and also the Ramon Magsaysay in the year 2004. Mamidipudi Ravindra Vikram was Chartered Accountant Director of Indian Bank and Indian Overseas Bank and son of Anandam.

Mamidipudi Pattabhiram was Associate Editor of The Hindu.

Mamidipudi Venkatarangaiya Foundation
Mamidipudi Venkatarangaiya Foundation was established in his memory in 1981 and presently working from Secunderabad. Their fields of working are Child Rights, Health and Natural Resource Management.

Shantha Sinha, Secretary of the Mamidipudi Venkatarangaiya (MV) Foundation, won the Ramon Magsaysay Award for Community Leadership in 2003.

References

Luminaries of Andhra Pradesh, Potti Sriramulu Telugu University, Hyderabad, 2005.

1889 births
1982 deaths
Telugu writers
Recipients of the Padma Bhushan in literature & education
Academic staff of Andhra University
Scientists from Andhra Pradesh
Writers from Andhra Pradesh
People from Nellore district
Indian political writers
20th-century Indian non-fiction writers
20th-century Indian historians